The Audi 50 (known internally as the Typ 86) is a supermini economy car produced by German automaker Audi from 1974 to 1978, and sold only in Europe. Introduced two or three years after the Italian Fiat 127 and the French Renault 5, the model was seen at the time as Germany's first home grown entrant in Europe's emerging "supermini" class.

History

Production
The Audi 50 was built by Audi NSU Auto Union AG at the former NSU factory in Neckarsulm, Germany, and at the giant Wolfsburg plant by Volkswagen.

Rebadging as Volkswagen Polo
The car was rebadged six weeks later by Volkswagen as the Volkswagen Polo with a wider range of engine and other options. The Volkswagen Polo was launched in the home market in September 1974 and appeared in export markets, including the United Kingdom, a few months later.

Continuation of Volkswagen Polo, discontinuation of Audi 50
The model was popular in Europe, both because of its generous specifications for a car of the time, and on account of its relatively low price. The Volkswagen and Audi badged models were sold alongside each other for three years until 1978, but the cheaper Volkswagen Polo outsold the Audi 50 almost immediately, and Audi discontinued the Audi 50 in 1978, after a total production of 180,812 units. A planned facelift, which would have given the Audi 50 a look closer to that of the Audi 100 and Audi 80 was never implemented, because of a holding company board decision that the Audi brand should concentrate on larger, more expensive cars.

The Volkswagen Polo range continued to evolve, with the Volkswagen Derby notchback version, despite being developed by Audi at Ingolstadt, branded as a Volkswagen and launched in 1977.  Subsequently, the Volkswagen Polo has evolved through numerous generations to the present day.

Successor
The Audi 50 had no replacement in the supermini class, until the launch of the significantly larger Audi A2 in November 1999, which was also discontinued in August 2005.

In August 2010, the Audi 50 was spiritually succeeded by the Audi A1.

References

50
Subcompact cars
Front-wheel-drive vehicles
Cars introduced in 1974